"I'm Mandy Fly Me" is a single by 10cc released in 1976. It was taken from the How Dare You! album, and reached No. 6 on the UK Singles Chart.

Writing and recording
In a radio interview, Stewart recalled the origins of the song:

He continued:

The album version of "I'm Mandy Fly Me" features an intro in form of one of the bridge sections of the band's 1974 song "Clockwork Creep". The section, whose lyrics are "Oh, no you'll never get me up in one of these again / 'Cause what goes up must come down", is rendered soft and tinny, as if heard playing from a portable transistor radio or an in-flight audio system.

Record World said that it has "shifting harmonies and twisting time signatures."

Personnel
 Eric Stewart - lead vocal, electric piano, grand piano, lead guitar (second solo), whistle, backing vocals
 Graham Gouldman - bass guitar, double bass, six string bass, acoustic guitar, zither, backing vocals
 Lol Creme - acoustic guitar, lead guitar (first solo), Moog synthesizer, vibraphone, backing vocals
 Kevin Godley - drums, backing vocals

Chart performance

References

10cc songs
1976 singles
Songs written by Eric Stewart
Songs written by Graham Gouldman
Songs written by Kevin Godley
Mercury Records singles
1976 songs